The 2011 Tour of Turkey is the 47th edition of the Presidential Cycling Tour of Turkey cycling stage race. It is being held from 24 April–1 May 2011, and is rated as a 2.HC event on the UCI Europe Tour. The last edition was won by 's rider Giovanni Visconti. Also Turkish 2 cycling teams, Manisaspor and Konya Şekerspor debuted in this race.

Teams and cyclists

There were 22 teams in the 2011 Tour of Turkey. Among them were 6 UCI ProTeams, 14 UCI Professional Continental teams, and 2 Continental teams. Each team was allowed eight riders on their squad, giving the event a peloton of 176 cyclists at its outset. The biggest names which compete here are Tyler Farrar, André Greipel, Alessandro Petacchi and Sandy Casar.

Stages

Stage 1
24 April 2011 – Istanbul,

Stage 2
25 April 2011 – Kuşadası to Turgutreis,

Stage 3
26 April 2011 – Bodrum to Marmaris,

Stage 4
27 April 2011 – Marmaris to Pamukkale,

Stage 5
28 April 2011 – Denizli to Fethiye,

Stage 6
29 April 2011 – Fethiye to Finike,

Stage 7
30 April 2011 – Tekirova to Manavgat,

Stage 8
1 May 2011 – Side to Alanya,

Classification leadership

References

Tour of Turkey
Tour of Turkey
Presidential Cycling Tour of Turkey by year